Vodafone Albania (part of Vodafone Group plc) is a major telecommunications company based in Tirana, Albania.

Technology

Vodafone Albania started offering GSM services on August 3, 2001, after AMC from 1996. The Display name of Vodafone is: Voda AL or VODAFONE AL 
  
In 2011, Vodafone was the first to launch 3G services. 4 years later, Vodafone was again first to launch a state of the art 4G/4G+ network.

In 2018 Plus the 4th largest mobile network provider ceased to operate in Albania. Vodafone had agreed to buy the 50% of the frequencies that Plus used to operate.

On February 12, 2019 Albania’s telecoms watchdog the Electronic and Postal Communications Authority (Autoritetit Te Komunikimeve Elektronike Dhe Postare, AKEP) has announced the results of the first round of its 800 MHz auction, confirming that Vodafone Albania was the only provider to submit a bid for the frequencies. The cellco offered just over EUR7.44 million (USD8.4 million) for a 2×10 MHz block of spectrum in the 800 MHz band. AKEP noted that its bid evaluation committee will now review the legal, economic and technical documentation accompanying Vodafone’s bid.

On October 16, 2019 AKEP gave the authorisation to test 5G networks on the frequency band of 3600 MHz-3700 MHz. And on October 30 it was publicly tested with state officials being present such as Edi Rama. Vodafone is the first company in Albania to bring the 5G network.

ABCom

On October 29 Vodafone Albania has agreed to acquire the country’s largest cable operator ABCom.“This transaction is part of Vodafone Group’s wider strategy to enhance its mobile businesses with broadband and pay-TV services,” Vodafone said in a press release late on Monday.The acquisition will enable Vodafone Albania to become a full service telecoms company by offering fixed and mobile communications and TV services to households and businesses, After the transaction is completed, Vodafone Albania intends to pursue a new strategic investment plan for AbCom. As of end June 2020 ABCom had 86.000 broadband subscribers behind Albtelecom with 133.000 subscribers.

Market Share
Albania as per Q1 2019 has 3.66 million subscribers, out of which there are 2.5 million active users (101% penetration rate). An active user is the number of users that communicated in the last three months.

The regulatory authority for telecommunication in Albania is the Electronic and Postal Communications Authority.

Economic and Social Investments
The company invested more than €1,415 million in Albania including investments in infrastructure, spectrum, regulatory fees, distribution channels, human resources etc. Only in 2016-17, Vodafone Albania invested €32 million in network infrastructure and about €16 million in spectrum acquisitions,In 1 January 2018,Vodafone Albania buys together with Telecom Albania(now One) PLUS Communication’s signal and frequencies,an fallimented operator from:AKEP.

Controversy

In 2017, operators changed the duration of their monthly packages to 28 days instead of 30. The matter was investigated by the Authority and the operators were ordered to resume the 30-day duration once again.

In 2019, the Albanian Competition Authority intervened after Vodafone Albania, Telekom Albania and Albtelecom increased their tariffs by ALL 200 and doubled the minimum recharge value from ALL 100 to ALL 200. The move sparked strong reactions from consumers who felt that the high price increase across three of the main providers was unfair and it was reported to the Competition Authority. The three companies took immediate action to lower the prices in accordance with the instructions of the Albanian Competition Authority.

See also
 List of mobile network operators of Europe
 Telekom Albania
 ALBtelecom Mobile

References

External links
 Vodafone Albania official website

Vodafone
Mobile phone companies of Albania
Telecommunications companies established in 2001